IL30 or IL-30 may be:

 Ilyushin Il-30, a Cold War-era Soviet ground attack aircraft
 Interleukin 30, a cytokine that forms a portion of interleukin 27
 Illinois Route 30, the former name of Illinois Route 91